Christcrusher is the third and final full length album by black metal band Thy Serpent. It is named after the sixth track on the album. It was recorded at Tico Tico Studios and features a more traditional black metal sound.

Track listing 
 Chambers of the Starwatcher 5:43
 Curtain of Treachery 4:21
 Thou Bade Nothingness 5:18
 So Free Are the Wolves 6:53
 Circle of Pain 5:21
 Christcrusher 3:23
 Crystalmoors 5:20
 Calm Blinking 5:25

Personnel 
 Azhemin - Bass, Vocals, Synthesizers
 Sami Tenetz - Guitars, Vocals
 Agathon - Drums, Screaming

References

External links 
 THY SERPENT DISCOGRAPHY

Thy Serpent albums
1998 albums
Spinefarm Records albums